Amagimi Dam  is a gravity dam located in Kumamoto Prefecture in Japan. The dam is used for flood control. The catchment area of the dam is 14.7 km2. The dam impounds about 15  ha of land when full and can store 1661 thousand cubic meters of water. The construction of the dam was started on 1961 and completed in 1970.

See also
List of dams in Japan

References

Dams in Kumamoto Prefecture